SS Cathay was the name of a number of ships, including:

 served with P & O until sold in 1890. 
SS Cathay, launched in 1924, served with P&O until bombed and sunk in 1942.
SS Cathay, launched in 1942 as Empire Archer, renamed Cathay in 1959 and operated by the Cathay Shipping Corporation, Panama and scrapped in 1963.
, completed for Compagnie Maritime Belge in 1957 as Baudouinville, withdrawn 1960, renamed Cathay in 1961 and operated by P&O. Transferred in 1969 to P&O subsidiary Eastern & Australian Steamship Company, (E&A). Withdrawn December 1975. Eventually passed to People's Republic of China as Kengshin, later Shanghai. Fate uncertain. Sister ship  was built as CMB's Jadotville in 1956, also transferred 1961 to P&O then to E&A (1970). Withdrawn 1975, later scrapped Taiwan.

References

Ship names